Mari Johanna Ivaska (born 1972) is a cancer researcher and molecular cell biology academy professor in University of Turku, Finland.

Early life and education 
Johanna Ivaska was born 1972 in Turku, Finland. Her father is emeritus analytical chemistry professor Ari Ivaska. She did her master's studies in University of Turku. Her PhD on collagen-binding integrins in University of Turku was give an honorary mention for an excellent PhD thesis by the Faculty of Medicine, University of Turku in 2001. After receiving a PhD she moved to London, UK for a postdoctoral work on investigating how integrins and protein kinases work together in cancer migration at Cancer Research UK with professor Peter J. Parker.

Academic career and research 
Ivaska established her lab in 2003 at VTT Technical Research Centre of Finland. Currently Ivaska Lab is situated in Turku Centre for Biotechnology. Ivaska's research concentrates on cell surface receptors called integrins and how these affect to cancer cell migration, invasion, tumour-stroma crosstalk and other processes that promote cancer progression. Research aims to find novel regulators for integrin activity, understanding the integrin traffic, and link between integrin activity regulation and mechanosensing. The group also does research on cellular machinery that facilitates cancer cell migration. In this, filopodia are important. Ivaska's group has discovered unconventional myosin that regulates filopodia formation, possibly providing a potential cancer therapeutic.

Awards and honours 

 The Ivaska group's publication in Nature Cell Biology won the Medix prize for the best national publication in medicine in 2017 and Elias Tillandz prize for best publication in Turku in 2017
 A.I. Virtanen prize, 2017
 Anders Jahre young investigator prize, 2011
 FEBS Anniversary prize in recognition of important achievement in the field of biochemistry, 2010
 L'Oreal-UNESCO for Women in Science award Finland, 2008
 Medix prize for the best scientific publication in Finland, 2008, 2012
 The Outstanding Young Persons of the World (TOYP) honouree
 European Molecular Biology Organisation Young investigator 2006
 Sigrid Juselius Young Investigator Prize, 2005

Major grants 

 European Research Council grants including an ERC Starting grant in 2008, ERC Consolidator grant in 2014 and Proof-of-concept grants in 2015 and 2018
 Roosa nauha (Pink ribbon) grants in 2013 and 2016

Affiliations 

 Editorial board member of Journal of Cell Biology, Cell Reports and Journal of Cell Science
 Member of the board, Instrumentariumin tiedesäätiö
 Member of European Molecular Biology Organisation

Personal life 
She is married to immunology professor Marko Salmi and they have twin girls (born 2005). Her hobbies include marathon running that she also does for charity, boating and outdoor life in the Archipelago Sea.

References

External links 

Living people
1972 births
Date of birth missing (living people)
People from Turku
Academic staff of the University of Turku
Cancer researchers
Finnish biologists
Cell biologists
Finnish women scientists
Members of the European Molecular Biology Organization
Finnish expatriates in England